Thomas Watson, 3rd Earl of Rockingham (30 December 1715 – 26 February 1746), styled Hon. Thomas Watson until 1745, was an English nobleman and politician. He represented Canterbury in the House of Commons and was appointed Lord Lieutenant of Kent after succeeding to the earldom, but died shortly thereafter.

The second son of Edward Watson, Viscount Sondes, Watson entered Eton College in 1725 and Lincoln's Inn in 1732. In the 1741 British general election, he stood for Canterbury as an opposition Whig. Watson and the Tory Thomas Best ousted the incumbent Sir Thomas Hales, a Whig supporter of Walpole's administration. He continued in opposition to successive governments during his tenure in the House of Commons, which terminated in 1745 when he became Earl of Rockingham on the death of his elder brother Lewis.

Despite his politics, he was appointed Lord Lieutenant of Kent in succession to his brother, but did not long survive the appointment: he died of smallpox at Rockingham Castle 26 February and was buried 11 March 1746 at Rockingham.

On his death, which brought to an end the male line of the Watsons of Rockingham Castle, the Earldom of Rockingham, the Viscountcy of Sondes of Lees Court, and the Barony of Throwley became extinct. He was succeeded as Baron Rockingham by Thomas Watson-Wentworth, 1st Earl of Malton, his first cousin once removed. Rockingham left his estate to his first cousin Lewis Monson, who thereafter adopted the surname of Watson.

References

Sources

1715 births
1746 deaths
People educated at Eton College
Members of Lincoln's Inn
Watson, Thomas
Watson, Thomas
Earls in the Peerage of Great Britain
Lord-Lieutenants of Kent